The 2016 FIVB Women's Club World Championship was the 10th edition of the event. It was held for the first time in the Philippines, on 18–23 October 2016 at the SM Mall of Asia Arena. For the first time, eight teams competed, including four wild cards.

The Philippine Super Liga and Eventcourt was in charge of organizing the tournament, together with the Larong Volleyball sa Pilipinas, Inc. (LVPI), the national federation for volleyball.

Turkey's Eczacıbaşı VitrA defeated Italy's Pomì Casalmaggiore in the final to become the first team in history to claim the title a second time after their 2015 success. Vakıfbank İstanbul defeated Voléro Zürich in the bronze medal match. Serbian Tijana Bošković from Eczacıbaşı was elected the Most Valuable Player.

Qualification

Pools composition

Squads

Venue

Pool standing procedure
 Number of matches won
 Match points
 Sets ratio
 Points ratio
 Result of the last match between the tied teams

Match won 3–0 or 3–1: 3 match points for the winner, 0 match points for the loser
Match won 3–2: 2 match points for the winner, 1 match point for the loser

Preliminary round
All times are Philippines Standard Time (UTC+08:00).

Pool A

        

|}

|}

Pool B

|}

|}

Classification 5th-8th
All times are Philippine Standard Time (UTC+08:00).

Classification 5th-8th

|}

7th place

|}

5th place

|}

Final round
All times are Philippine Standard Time (UTC+08:00).

Semifinals

|}

3rd place match

|}

Final

|}

Final standing

Awards

Most Valuable Player
 Tijana Bošković (Eczacıbaşı VitrA)
Best Setter
 Carli Lloyd (Pomì Casalmaggiore)
Best Outside Hitters
 Zhu Ting (Vakıfbank İstanbul)
 Tatiana Kosheleva (Eczacıbaşı VitrA)

Best Middle Blockers
 Foluke Akinradewo (Voléro Zürich)
 Milena Rašić (Vakıfbank İstanbul)
Best Opposite Spiker
 Tijana Bošković (Eczacıbaşı VitrA)
Best Libero
 Fabiana de Oliveira (Rexona-Sesc Rio)

See also
2016 FIVB Volleyball Men's Club World Championship

References

External links

2016
2016 in volleyball
2016 in women's volleyball
International volleyball competitions hosted by the Philippines
Voll
October 2016 sports events in Asia